Ronald Eaglesham Porter (born 26 April 1956), known professionally as Ron Donachie, is a Scottish actor. He is known for starring as DI John Rebus in the BBC Radio 4 dramatisations of the Ian Rankin "Rebus" detective novels and for his supporting roles in films The Jungle Book (1994), Titanic and television series Doctor Who and Game of Thrones.

Biography 

Ronald Porter was born in Dundee, Scotland and educated at Madras College, St Andrews  where he performed in three school plays: Serjeant Musgrave's Dance  in 1972, A Man For All Seasons  in 1973 for which the newspaper review said "Ron Porter was impressive from start to finish, handling a mammoth part with apparent ease, giving a sensitive, subtle and well-controlled performance, especially in the second act", and Taming of the Shrew  in 1974 for which the newspaper review said "Ron Porter’s affability shines out like the proverbial beacon ... as the most experienced member of the cast, he has the confidence to be able to establish an immediate rapport with the audience. ... [He] turned in his usual high standard of performance as the enormously arrogant Petruchio".

His education continued at the University of Glasgow where he was President of the Glasgow University Students' Representative Council (1976–1977) and graduated MA (Hons) in English Literature and Drama in 1979.

He joined John McGrath's 7:84 theatre group for their 1980–1981 touring production, John Burrows' One Big Blow, in which the cast mimicked a traditional colliery band by singing in six part harmony. Following the success of this play members of the cast founded the a cappella vocal group The Flying Pickets in 1982, but Donachie left before their 1983 Christmas number one hit.

Donachie married Fiona Biggar, a complementary therapist, in 1989; the couple have two children: the actor Daniel Portman and Naomi Porter, a linguist. His brother, Stewart Porter, is also an actor and his sister-in-law is Scottish film costume designer Trisha Biggar.

Although Donachie has been prolific in television and films, these have all been ensemble or supporting parts. His leading roles on radio and the theatre have achieved acclaim:

“Ron Donachie plays [Rebus] in the BBC radio versions and he’s really got the voice”
— Ian Rankin, author of the Rebus novels 

Ron Donachie plays her father with an authority that makes his role as a sexual predator even more creepy.
— Six Characters in Search of an Author  – Mark Fisher, The Guardian 

When Ron Donachie takes the stage as Deputy Governor Danforth in the second half of Arthur Miller’s classic, it’s as if this 17th century parable of superstition and intolerance has a new centre of gravity. It’s partly that Donachie seems three times bigger than everyone else, a bullish figure, no less fearsome for his legal attire. It’s partly that his charismatic stillness commands attention and defies contradiction. But it’s also that, in presenting himself as reasonable, considerate and fair, he puts you in mind of every leader who gets his way by masking ruthless force with politeness.— The Crucible review – Mark Fisher, The Guardian

Film

Television

Theatre

Radio

References

External links 

 
 
 Ron Donachie at Theatricalia
 Ron Donachie at CDA Theatrical Agency

1956 births
Scottish male film actors
Scottish male television actors
Scottish male stage actors
Scottish male radio actors
Male actors from Dundee
People educated at Madras College
Alumni of the University of Glasgow
Living people